Melanoxanthus senegalensis is a species of click beetle belonging to the family Elateridae. This species can be found in Senegal and Guinea-Bissau.

References
 Synopsis of the described coleoptera of the world

Elateridae
Beetles described in 1893